Mahar Muhammad Fayyaz is a Pakistani politician who was a Member of the Provincial Assembly of the Punjab, from 2008 to May 2018.

Early life and education
He was born on 20 September 1965 in Dina in Mahar Gujjar Family.

He graduated from University of the Punjab and has the degree of Bachelor of Arts.

Political career

He ran for the seat of the Provincial Assembly of the Punjab as a candidate of Pakistan Muslim League (N) (PML-N) from Constituency PP-25 (Jhelum-II) in 2002 Pakistani general election, but was unsuccessful. He 31,052 votes and lost the seat to Chaudhry Tasneem Nasir, a candidate of Pakistan Muslim League (Q) (PML-Q).

He was elected to the Provincial Assembly of the Punjab as a candidate of PML-N from Constituency PP-25 (Jhelum-II) in 2008 Pakistani general election. He received 46,015 votes and defeated Chaudhary Qurban Hussain, a candidate of PML-Q.

He was re-elected to the Provincial Assembly of the Punjab as a candidate of PML-N from Constituency PP-25 (Jhelum-II) in 2013 Pakistani general election. He received 48,594 votes and defeated Abid Hussain, a candidate of Pakistan Tehreek-e-Insaf (PTI).

References

Living people
Punjab MPAs 2013–2018
1965 births
Pakistan Muslim League (N) politicians
Punjab MPAs 2008–2013

Politicians from Jhelum